The 1981–82 Football League season was Birmingham City Football Club's 79th in the Football League and their 47th in the First Division. They finished in 16th position in the 22-team division. They lost in their opening match in both cup competitions: to Ipswich Town in the third round proper of the 1981–82 FA Cup and to Nottingham Forest in the second round of the League Cup.

Twenty-four players appeared in at least one first-team game, and Dutch international midfielder Toine van Mierlo made most appearances, with 43 of the possible 45. There were 14 different goalscorers; Tony Evans was the club's leading scorer with 16 goals, of which 15 were scored in the league.

Football League First Division

League table (part)

Three points for a win were first awarded in the Football League in 1981–82.

FA Cup

League Cup

Appearances and goals

Numbers in parentheses denote appearances as substitute.
Players with name struck through and marked  left the club during the playing season.
Players with names in italics and marked * were on loan from another club for the whole of their season with Birmingham.

See also
Birmingham City F.C. seasons

References
General
 
 
 Source for match dates, league positions and results: 
 Source for lineups, appearances, goalscorers and attendances: Matthews (2010), Complete Record, pp. 398–99.

Specific

Birmingham City F.C. seasons
Birmingham City